John Burroughs High School is a public high school located in Burbank, in Los Angeles County. It is known for its notable alumni, and being the filming location for many television shows.

History
The school was built in the 1920s, but was not established as a high school until 1948.  The school was named after naturalist John Burroughs.

Academics
The school scored a 768 on the Academic Performance Index in 2007, and in 2010 reached a score of 819, meeting the school's 12th consecutive goal.  90% of students passed the math portion of the CAHSEE (California High School Exit Exams) on the first attempt, while 92% of students passed the English portion of the CAHSEE on first attempt.

Athletics

The track and field team produced Olympic silver medalist Ron Morris (Rome, 1960).

In 2016, the boys' varsity water polo team won the school's second CIF championship.

Performing arts

Choirs
The school has seven award-winning choirs including Powerhouse, the advanced mixed show choir, also known as Chamber when competing; Madrigals, the advanced women’s choir, also known as Sound Sensations when competing; Sound Waves, the intermediate mixed choir; Decibelles, the intermediate women’s choir; Men @ Work, the men’s choir; Vocal Ensemble, selected members from Chamber in an a cappella ensemble; Muses, selected members from Madrigals in an a cappella ensemble.

The school's advanced mixed show choir, Powerhouse, has won awards including the Grand Championship at Fame Orlando 2007, Grand Champions at Fame Chicago 2008, Grand Champions at Fame New York 2009, Grand Champions at Fame New York 2012, and Grand Champions of FAME Hollywood 2013.  The two advanced show choirs of John Burroughs High School, "Powerhouse" and "Sound Sensations" also won Grand Championship at Fame Chicago 2013. They were also awarded Grand Champions of New England Show Choir Showdown in 2015. With the grand championship, Powerhouse also received caption awards for Best Choreography, Best Costumes, Best Diction, Best Female Sound, Best Tech Crew, and Best Male Soloist.  Sound Sensations received the award for Best Vocals of the Women's Division. The John Burroughs High School choirs have a record of being undefeated in various seasons.  The Advanced Women Show Choir, Sound Sensations, has remained undefeated in 2010, 2013 and 2015; and the Intermediate Mixed Show Choir, Sound Waves, remained undefeated in 2012 and 2017.  In 2010 Powerhouse performed on The Oprah Winfrey Show. Also in the fall of 2010, the Powerhouse Choir performed on Dancing With The Stars. Powerhouse has performed twice on The Voice. And, in February 2011, Powerhouse Choir performed for the Chinese New Year Night Parade at Hong Kong, representing the U.S.

Band
There are four bands: Concert Band, Symphonic Band, Wind Ensemble and Jazz Ensemble (A Band and B Band) as well as a Drumline and Color Guard at Burroughs. In 2006, the marching band played in a sound byte for Shrek the Third and was featured in the animated movie. In 2010, they recorded for the movie "Megamind". They were selected to play at the 2011 Sugar Bowl half-time show in New Orleans, Louisiana. Soon afterwards, they were invited to be featured on Ellen for her 2011 Super Bowl Special.

The JBHS marching band was featured in the 1994 movie "Little Giants," which included sound from the percussion line just prior to the big game.

The JBHS Marching band was featured in a comedy skit for the 70's NBC television show "Laugh-In" which aired on Nov. 8, 1971.

District
John Burroughs High School is a member of the Burbank Unified School District (BUSD).

Notable alumni

Many actors and actresses have attended the school due to its proximity to major entertainment studios such as NBCUniversal, Warner Bros. and Walt Disney Studios, as well as voice recording and animation studios including Nickelodeon and Cartoon Network.

Wayne Allwine, actor, official voice of Mickey Mouse from 1977-2009
Eric Balfour, actor
Patrick Bristow, actor, Ellen, Showgirls
Eben Britton, NFL player
Debbe Dunning, actress and model, Home Improvement
Joan Freeman, actress and director, Roustabout, The Reluctant Astronaut, Friday the 13th: The Final Chapter
Sam Gifaldi, former child actor, Hey Arnold!, A Bug's Life, The Mommies
Dan Haggerty, actor, The Life and Times of Grizzly Adams
Adam Hendershott, actor
Elden Henson, actor
Clint Howard, actor, Gentle Ben TV series and many films
Ron Howard, actor, The Andy Griffith Show, Happy Days, and Academy Award-winning director
Erik Kramer, NFL quarterback and sports commentator
Jonna Lee, actress, Making the Grade, Another World
Mike Magnante, professional baseball player
Guy Mariano, professional skateboarder
Tim Matheson, actor, National Lampoon's Animal House, The West Wing, Van Wilder
Lindsey McKeon, actor, One Tree Hill; briefly attended but did not graduate
Brittany Murphy, actress
Debbie Reynolds, Oscar-nominated actress, singer and entertainer, Singin' in the Rain; attended when the school was a junior high school  Graduated from Burbank High School.
Rene Russo, actress, Lethal Weapon 3, Tin Cup, Ransom, The Thomas Crown Affair, Thor
Lynn Shackelford, UCLA basketball player and sports commentator for Los Angeles Lakers
Ron Stillwell, professional baseball player
Veronica St. Clair, Actress La Brea
Angela Watson, actress, Step by Step
Weston "Westballz" Dennis, (Class of 2009, dropped out) professional Super Smash Bros. Melee player
Blake and Dylan Tuomy-Wilhoit, child actors, Full House, 
Rob Zabrecky, actor, magician, and songwriter

In the media

The Wonder Years used the school for the TV series.
The Brady Bunch filmed on campus.
The Good Place used the school's cafeteria.
 Tonic's music video, "You Wanted More" was filmed at Burroughs for the movie. American Pie
Glee scenes were filmed in the hallways.
Fired Up filmed scenes showing the school.
Walt Disney's Blackbeard's Ghost used the football and track fields.
On My Block was filmed throughout the school.

References

External links

 Burroughs High School
 Burroughs Athletics
 John Burroughs Vocal Music Program

Burbank Unified School District
High schools in Los Angeles County, California
Public high schools in California
Buildings and structures in Burbank, California
Educational institutions established in 1948
1948 establishments in California